Mei Shaowu (22 December 1928 – 28 September 2005) was a Chinese translator, author and scholar who was honorary president of the Mei Lanfang Memorial Hall and president of the Mei Lanfang Literature and Art Research Association. He also was a researcher in the Chinese Academy of Social Sciences.

Mei was the first person from China to translate the works of the American novelist Vladimir Nabokov to Chinese language.

Mei was a member of the 6th, 7th, 8th, 9th National Committee of the Chinese People's Political Consultative Conference.

Biography
Mei was born Mei Baozhen in December 1928 in Beijing, with his ancestral home in Taizhou, Jiangsu, the son of Fu Zhifang, a Beijing opera actress, and Mei Lanfang, also a Beijing opera actor.
His elder brother, Mei Baochen (1925 - 2008), an architect who was graduated from Aurora University. His younger brother, Mei Baojiu, a Beijing opera actor, was born in 1934. His younger sister, Mei Baoyue (1930 - 2000), a Beijing opera actress who graduated from Aurora University.

Mei primarily studied in Shanghai.

During the Second Sino-Japanese War, Mei Lanfang escaped from Beijing and settled in Hong Kong, Mei and his brother attended Lingnan Secondary School.

When Hong Kong was occupied by the Imperial Japanese Army, Mei went to Guiyang, Guizhou, he studied at Qinghua High School.

Mei entered Hangchow University in 1946, majoring in engineering at the Department of Engineering.

In 1947, Mei was admitted to Yenching University, majoring in English at the Department of Western Languages, he took French and German as elective courses.
After graduating in 1952 he was appointed to the Beijing Library, then he was transferred to the Chinese Academy of Social Sciences.

Mei died of colon cancer at Beijing Tumour Hospital on September 28, 2005.

Works
 Memoirs of Mei Lanfang
 Beijing opera and Mei Lanfang
 My Father: Mei Lanfang

Translations
 An Hungarian Nabob (Jokai Mor)
 Poetry of Pottier (Eugene Pottier)
 Puning (Vladimir Nabokov)
 Pale Fire (Vladimir Nabokov)
 Salem Witch (Arthur Miller)
 The Thin Man (Dashiell Hammett)
 The Selected Works of Sherlock Holmes (Conan Doyle)

Awards
 National Book Award
 Chinese Translation Association – Competent Translator (2004)

Personal life
Mei married translator Tu Zhen in 1956 in Beijing, she was a graduate of Peking University, where she majored in French language.

References

1928 births
2005 deaths
Writers from Beijing
Peking University alumni
Zhejiang University alumni
English–Chinese translators
People's Republic of China translators
Chinese biographers
20th-century biographers
21st-century biographers
20th-century Chinese translators
21st-century Chinese translators
Mei Lanfang